Ransäter Church is a wood church, located in Ransäter in Värmland, Sweden.

History
In the 17th century a lumber longhouse church was built in Ransäter, after initiative from Johan Börjesson Carlberg. In the 1740s the church was rebuilt as a cross church, but on 6 December 1983 the church burnt down. The present wood church opened on Candlemas Day 1986, where the architect was Jerk Alton. The church also includes pictures by Sven-Bertil Svensson. The pipe organ in the church was built in 1988 by Grönlunds Orgelbyggeri.

Politician Tage Erlander and his wife Aina are buried on the cemetery near the church.

References

External links

Churches completed in 1986
Churches in the Diocese of Karlstad
20th-century Church of Sweden church buildings
Churches in Värmland County
1986 establishments in Sweden